Derek Bruce Hough (born May 17, 1985) is an American professional Latin and ballroom dancer, choreographer, actor and singer. From 2007 to 2016, Hough was a professional dancer on the ABC dance competition series Dancing with the Stars, winning the show a record-breaking six times with his celebrity partners. For his work, Hough received eleven nominations for the Primetime Emmy Awards for Outstanding Choreography, winning the award three times. Hough later became a judge on the series beginning with its 29th season.

Hough has also appeared as an actor on stage, appearing at the West End premiere of Footloose: The Musical at the Novello Theatre and as well as the 2015 New York Spring Spectacular at Radio City Music Hall in New York City. In film and television, he has starred in the film Make Your Move and had a recurring role in the ABC musical-drama Nashville. In 2016, he appeared as Corny Collins in NBC's live musical TV-production of Hairspray Live!

From 2017 to 2020, Hough served as a judge on the NBC dance competition series World of Dance.

Early life
 Hough grew up the fourth of five children in a Latter-day Saint family in Sandy, Utah, a suburb of Salt Lake City. He is the son of Marianne and Bruce Hough, who was twice chairman of the Utah Republican Party, and has four sisters, Sharee, Marabeth, Katherine, and Julianne. All of his grandparents were dancers, and his parents met while on a ballroom dancing team in college in Idaho. He is the second cousin of musicians Riker, Rydel, Rocky, Ryland Lynch and Ross Lynch from R5; their maternal grandmothers are sisters.

When Hough was 12, his divorcing parents sent him to London to live and study with dance coaches Corky and Shirley Ballas. Hough's sister Julianne joined him in London several months later. Originally intending to stay for three months, Hough remained in London for ten years (Julianne returned after five years). The Ballases helped tutor the two Hough children alongside their own son, Mark Ballas, schooling them at the Italia Conti Academy of Theatre Arts. They received training in song, theater, gymnastics, and many forms of dance, including jazz, ballet, and tap. The three children formed their own pop music trio 2B1G ("2 Boys, 1 Girl") and performed at dance competitions in the UK and the U.S., and showcased UK television shows. Hough subsequently taught at the Italia Conti Academy of Theatre Arts. As well as being trained in many forms of dance, Hough can also play the piano, guitar, drums and bass.

Career

Competitive dancing and choreography
Hough won the WDSF World Latin Championship in 2002, and the Blackpool U-21 Latin title with Aneta Piotrowska in 2003. He has won the LA Outstanding Dancer of the Year and New York Dance Alliance Outstanding Dance awards.

On September 22, 2013, for the first time, the category for Outstanding Choreography for the Emmy Awards was moved to the Primetime Live Show, and all of the nominees in the category were to create and perform a number with the host of the show, Neil Patrick Harris. Hough, who was nominated for Dancing with the Stars, was part of that number, along with the other nominees. Ken Ehrlich, the executive producer of the show, stated, "It's definitely going to be an original number, something that hasn't been done before. It's going to utilize the talents of all of them to put this number together as choreographers." Hough then went on to win the Emmy Award for Outstanding Choreography. On September 12, 2015, Hough won his second Emmy Award for Outstanding Choreography, alongside Julianne Hough and Tessandra Chavez. This was both Julianne Hough's and Chavez's first Emmy win for outstanding choreography. Including the two nominations that he went on to win, Hough has been nominated for nine Emmy Awards for choreography.

Sochi 2014 Winter Olympics
In 2013, Hough worked with world champion ice dancers Meryl Davis and Charlie White on a number for their upcoming 2014 Sochi winter Olympics short dance program that had to contain quickstep and foxtrot rhythms. Davis and White went on to win the gold medal with the routine. Their win made Olympic history, marking the first Olympic title in the event for the United States. About this opportunity, Hough said:

Move Live On Tour
On March 18, 2014, Hough, along with his sister, Julianne, announced a summer tour of over 40 cities across the U.S. and Canada, called "Move Live on Tour", which would include dancing and singing from both of them, and the appearance of a group of dancers employed by the Houghs who were chosen through auditions. They embarked on the sold-out tour on May 25, 2014, in Park City, Kansas and ended it in Los Angeles on July 26, 2014. Due to the success of ticket sales and several sold-out venues before the tour had officially kicked off, several more shows were added to the tour schedule, which also sold out. For the tour choreography, the Hough siblings collaborated with Nappytabs.

Following the success of the 2014 tour and high demand, the Houghs announced the return of "Move Live on Tour" in the summer of 2015. Spanning from June 12, 2015, to August 8, 2015, the sold-out tour visited over 40 cities throughout the U.S. and Canada, and visited larger venues than in the previous year. Tabitha and Napoleon D'umo "Nappytabs" returned as collaborating choreographers alongside the Hough siblings. Auditions were also held to recruit a new group of dancers to join the Houghs, although some back-up dancers from the previous year returned.

On July 9, 2016, the Houghs held a free fitness pop-up event called 'Move Interactive' in Los Angeles, which they announced would be the first of many to come. The event started off in Sherman Oaks with a workout session at Pulse Fitness Studios led by celebrity personal trainer and owner, Mark Harari. The participants then took part in a 2-mile run along Ventura Blvd, before finishing off with a dance fitness class at JustDance Los Angeles. According to Hough, the motivation behind the event was to "bring health, love, community and human interaction into our everyday lives." The following week, on July 14, the Houghs held a second free Move Interactive event in Fryman Canyon, LA, which included a hike and team building exercises.

On December 14, 2016, they announced, via social media, that they would be going on a new tour, MOVE BEYOND Live on Tour, in 2017.

Dancing with the Stars
Hough made his first appearance on Dancing with the Stars in season four (week 6) as a guest instructor with Julianne and Apolo Anton Ohno. He then joined the cast of professional instructors in season five and was paired with Jennie Garth. Hough and Garth were eliminated in the semi-finals finishing the competition in fourth place.

For season six, Hough was paired with actress Shannon Elizabeth. They were eliminated from the show on April 29, 2008, finishing the competition in sixth place.

For season seven, Hough was partnered with model/TV host Brooke Burke. In rehearsal on October 4, 2008, Hough tripped and fell, hitting his head on the floor and momentarily blacked out. He was sent to the hospital, but sustained no injuries. Hough and Burke earned the mirror ball trophy and won season seven on November 25, 2008.

For season eight, Hough was paired with rapper Lil' Kim. They were eliminated on May 5, 2009, from the show finishing in fifth place.

For season nine, Hough was partnered with model Joanna Krupa. They were eliminated during week nine, the semi-finals, on November 17, 2009, finishing fourth.

For season ten, Hough was partnered with Nicole Scherzinger, the lead singer from the singing group The Pussycat Dolls and former member of Eden's Crush. The couple reached the finals and won the competition on May 25, 2010. That was the second win for Hough.

For season eleven, Hough won for the third time with actress Jennifer Grey, known for her film roles on Dirty Dancing and Ferris Bueller's Day Off, on November 23, 2010.

Hough did not participate in season 12 in order to be a part of the film COBU 3D (later renamed to Make your Move 3D).

For season 13, he was partnered with actress and TV host Ricki Lake, known playing the original Tracy Turnblad in Hairspray. Lake scored consistently high the whole season and ended up in third place.

For season 14, Hough partnered with television personality Maria Menounos. In week seven, the couple earned the first 30 of the season and topped the leader board the first time in the season. The couple made it to the semi-finals but were eliminated after they finished at the top of the leader board. Menounos became the second celebrity in Dancing with the Stars history to be eliminated on a night where she came in first place with the judges (the first was Willa Ford in season three).

For season 15 (All Stars), Hough was paired with season eight champion, Shawn Johnson. They were runners-up to Melissa Rycroft and Tony Dovolani.

On July 27, 2012, Hough announced that season 15 would be his last. A few months later, on February 22, 2013, Hough announced that he would be back for season 16, stating on his Twitter account, "Wasn’t sure if I was able to do this season because of my other projects, but worked it out so I can do both. #pumped.". He was partnered with country singer and former American Idol contestant, Kellie Pickler. On May 21, 2013, Pickler was crowned season 16 champion, marking the fourth time Derek won the Mirror Ball trophy, and made him the only pro to have won four Mirror Balls.

On August 2, 2013, Hough confirmed that he would be back for season 17 via an interview with Access Hollywood. The cast for season 17 was announced on September 4, 2013. Hough's partner for season 17 was Glee star Amber Riley. Riley was crowned season 17 champion, historically marking the fifth time Hough has won the Mirror Ball trophy, and made him once again the only pro to have won five Mirror Balls.

For season 18, Hough was paired with paralympic snowboarder, Amy Purdy. In the finale on May 20, 2014, the couple was runner-up for the season, behind Meryl Davis and her partner Maksim Chmerkovskiy.

On August 13, 2014, ABC announced that Hough would be back for the season 19 and in September, it was announced that he would be paired with YouTube personality Bethany Mota. The couple made it to the first night of the finals, finishing in fourth place.

On February 24, 2015, Hough was announced as one of the returning professional dancers on season 20 despite previously reporting he would not be taking part in this season. He was partnered with gymnast Nastia Liukin. They made it to the semi-finals, but were subsequently eliminated on May 12, finishing in fourth place.

For season 21, he was paired with wildlife conservationist and daughter of Steve Irwin, Bindi Irwin. The couple made it to the finals and won the competition on November 24, 2015, marking Hough's sixth win on the show. Hough did not return for Season 22.

On August 30, 2016, it was revealed that Hough would once again return as a professional dancer for season 23. He was paired with actress Marilu Henner. They were eliminated on November 7, 2016, finishing in 6th place which is tied for his lowest finish.

On September 8, 2020, it was revealed, after much speculation, that Hough would replace longtime DWTS judge Len Goodman. Due to the travel restrictions between England and the United States during the coronavirus pandemic, Goodman was unable to return for season 29. He returned as a judge for its 30th and 31st seasons.

Celebrity partners

Performance history
Season 5: celebrity partner Jennie Garth; average: 25.6; placed: 4th

Season 6: celebrity partner: Shannon Elizabeth; average: 24.5;  placed: 6th

Season 7: celebrity partner: Brooke Burke; average: 27.1; placed: 1st

Season 8: celebrity partner: Lil' Kim; average: 25.8; placed: 5th

Season 9: celebrity partner: Joanna Krupa; average: 25.5; placed: 4th

Season 10: celebrity partner: Nicole Scherzinger; average: 27.5; placed: 1st

Season 11: celebrity partner: Jennifer Grey; average: 27.2; placed: 1st

Season 13: celebrity Partner: Ricki Lake;  Average: 26.7;   Placed: 3rd

Season 14: celebrity partner: Maria Menounos; average: 26.8; placed: 4th

Season 15: celebrity partner: Shawn Johnson; average: 27.9; Placed: 2nd

Season 16: Celebrity partner: Kellie Pickler; average: 27.4; placed: 1st

Season 17: Celebrity partner: Amber Riley; average: 27.8; placed: 1st

Season 18: Celebrity partner: Amy Purdy; average: 27.9; placed: 2nd

Season 19: Celebrity partner: Bethany Mota average: 36.3; placed: 4th

Season 20: Celebrity partner: Nastia Liukin average: 36.6; placed: 4th

Season 21: celebrity partner Bindi Irwin; average: 27.9; placed: 1st

Season 23: Celebrity partner: Marilu Henner average: 31.7; placed: 6th

World of Dance
In May 2017, Hough joined NBC's new dance competition series World of Dance as a judge, alongside Jennifer Lopez and Ne-Yo and host/mentor Jenna Dewan. It was the top premiere of a new summer alternative series on broadcast in five years and the most-watched in nine years. It was picked up for a second and continued to a third season and then a fourth.

Theater
Hough's earliest theater work include playing the lead in Jesus Christ Superstar at the Millfield Theatre, and dancing in the company in Chitty Chitty Bang Bang at the London Palladium.

In 2006, Hough starred as Ren in the original cast production of Footloose: The Musical at the Novelo Theatre in London's West End, as well as on the 2006 UK national tour. Hough's West End performance earned him a nomination as The Stuart Phillips London Newcomer of the Year in the Whatsonstage.com Theatregoers' Choice Awards. Hough made his Broadway debut on January 8, 2010, starring with Kym Johnson and Mary Murphy in Burn the Floor for the final four performances of the show's Broadway run.

On January 13, 2015, it was announced that Hough would appear in the New York Spring Spectacular, at Radio City Music Hall. Due to the production, it was announced that Hough would not return for the 10th anniversary of Dancing with the Stars, however, during the cast announcement, Hough and partner Nastia Liukin were revealed as surprise contestants.

Acting
Hough made two cameo appearances; one in 2001 in the movie Harry Potter and the Sorcerer's Stone and one in 2012 in the movie Rock of Ages, where his sister Julianne was playing the female lead role. In 2011, Hough took one season break from Dancing with the Stars to star in his first movie Make Your Move (original title Cobu 3D) that premiered three years later, on March 31, 2014, in Los Angeles.

On April 25, 2011, Hough made a guest appearance on the ABC show Better with You as a dance instructor. On August 14, 2014, it was announced that he would join the cast of the ABC series Nashville for a multi-episode arc as Noah West. After three episodes during season three, Hough's character returns in the fourth season for more episodes.

On April 18, 2016, Hough guest starred on The CW series, Jane the Virgin.

On April 27, 2016, it was announced that Hough would play Corny Collins in the NBC live broadcast of Hairspray, which aired on December 7.

Other media
Hough was one of Bruno Tonioli's panelists on BBC One's DanceX, the first episode of which aired on July 14, 2007. He went on to choreograph and perform in Cheryl Cole's "Parachute" music video, after being introduced to her by Tonioli.

Hough was a founding member of the Ballas Hough Band (formerly Almost Amy) and he shared lead vocals, played guitar and had several songwriting credits on the band's self-titled debut CD that was released by Hollywood Records in March 2009.

Hough directed Mark Ballas' music video for his song "Get My Name" that was released on MTV on May 14, 2014.

Hough's first book Taking the Lead: Lessons from a Life in Motion came out on August 5, 2014 and managed to enter The New York Times Best Seller list on August 24, 2014.

Along with Ballas, Hough bought a house in order to flip it for profit. The process of the home renovation was broadcast as a four episode series on HGTV called Mark & Derek's Excellent Flip. The show aired in the Spring of 2015.

In 2016, Hough appeared alongside Lindsey Stirling in the music video for The Arena which he also choreographed.

In 2017, Hough participated in the celebrity edition of American Ninja Warrior for Red Nose Day.

In 2017, in an interview with Billboard, Hough revealed that he is going to be performing on the alternative metal band Breaking Benjamin's upcoming album Ember, scheduled for a release in 2018.

In September 2019, Hough hosted an NBC special Return to Downton Abbey: A Grand Event. In November 2019, Hough had emergency surgery to remove his appendix due to appendicitis; he published a video of himself dancing with Hayley Erbert post-surgery.

In September 2020, he signed a wide-ranging deal with ABC Entertainment.

Filmography

Film

Television

Music videos

Theater

Awards and honors
Hough is a three-time Emmy winner for Outstanding Choreography and has earned eight Emmy Award nominations in total for his work on Dancing with the Stars.

On April 10, 2014, Hough and his sister, Julianne, were honored at Mattel Children's Hospital UCLA's second annual Kaleidoscope Ball with the Kaleidoscope Award, an award that is given to people of the entertainment industry who bring light and laughter into the lives of children through their professional achievements and personal humanitarianism.

On October 17, 2014, GLSEN, during its annual Respect Awards, honored Hough with the year's Inspiration Award.

References

External links

 
 

1985 births
21st-century American male singers
21st-century American singers
American expatriates in England
Alumni of the Italia Conti Academy of Theatre Arts
American ballroom dancers
American choreographers
American male dancers
American male film actors
American male musical theatre actors
American male stage actors
American male television actors
Dancers from Utah
Dancing with the Stars (American TV series) winners
Judges in American reality television series
Living people
People from Sandy, Utah
Primetime Emmy Award winners
Singers from Utah